Conocephalus obtectus is a species of Tettigoniidae (bush-crickets or katydids) found in La Réunion. and in Congo

It has a bodylength of 13mm.

References

obtectus
Insects described in 1907